The International Convention Center Kaohsiung (ICCK) is a convention center in Yancheng District, Kaohsiung, Taiwan.

History
In early 1991, Kaohsiung City Government started a plan to build a convention center in Yancheng District. In 2000, the construction of Kaohsiung Business Exhibition Center was completed. The center was run by a private sector from then until 13 March 2007. In May 2010, the city government took over the operation of the center. In January 2012, the Grand Conference Management Company was commissioned to operate and manage the center.

In July 2012, the city government transformed the Kaohsiung Business Exhibition Center into the International Convention Center Kaohsiung. Major renovations were made including expanding the 6 conference rooms to 26. A total up to 200 tables for banquet style dining can now be accommodated on its first floor, as well as parking spaces for 500 cars. The convention center was finally completed and trial operation started on 4 November 2012. It was then officially opened in 2013.

Architecture
The building is a six-story structure with a total floor area of 163,180 m2. Each floor has a maximum exhibition area of 2,800 m2. The center can accommodate meetings for up to 1,500 people and exhibitions of up to 380 booths.

Transportation
The center is accessible within walking distance North East from Yanchengpu Station of Kaohsiung MRT.

See also
List of tourist attractions in Taiwan

References

External links

 

2000 establishments in Taiwan
Commercial buildings completed in 2000
Convention centers in Kaohsiung